The 1953 Wake Forest Demon Deacons football team was an American football team that represented Wake Forest University during the 1953 college football season. In their third season under head coach Tom Rogers, the Demon Deacons compiled a 3–6–1 record and finished in a three-way tie for third place in the Atlantic Coast Conference with a 2–3 record against conference opponents.

Schedule

Team leaders

References

Wake Forest
Wake Forest Demon Deacons football seasons
Wake Forest Demon Deacons football